Salvacion "Sally" Ponce-Enrile (née Santiago; born March 12, 1970) is a Filipino politician and wife of former Congressman Jack Enrile of the 1st District of Cagayan. She held the same position in the 14th and 16th Congress. She is Founder & Co-chairperson of an investment firm with a focus on financial technology startups.

She is also an artist. Some of her works are available at FDX Online. She is also an artist-in-residence at Rossocinabro Gallery, Rome, and is currently represented by several galleries in Europe and New York.

Education 
Sally got her College Degree at Christian Heritage College, California, Class of 1994. She obtained a master's degree in Psychology from Assumption College, in the Philippines.  She also has a master's degree in Criminal Justice from Boston University and is a member of the Alpha Phi Sigma National Criminal Justice Honor Society.

Political career 
Her political career started in 2007 as Representative of the 1st District of Cagayan in the Congress of the Philippines, serving for two terms - from 2007 to 2010 and 2013–2016. Her husband preceded and succeeded her in the congressional seat.

References

External links 

|-

Living people
Nationalist People's Coalition politicians
People from Manila
People from Cagayan
Members of the House of Representatives of the Philippines from Cagayan
Assumption College San Lorenzo alumni
Boston University alumni
1970 births